Simen Lieungh (born 16 March 1960) is a Norwegian businessperson.

He was hired as CEO of Aker Solutions in 2008. He was director of Field Development in Aker Solutions from 2002 to 2007, and CEO of Arne Blystad AS from 2007 to 2008. He has education from Norwegian University of Science and Technology, and has worked as a researcher at the Norwegian Defence Research Establishment.

As of October 2010 Lieungh is the CEO of Odfjell Drilling.

He resides in Nittedal.

References

1960 births
Living people
Norwegian businesspeople
Norwegian University of Science and Technology alumni
People from Nittedal